Miller Spur is an ice-covered spur that descends northeast from Mount Giles, near the coast of Marie Byrd Land, Antarctica. It was observed and photographed on December 18, 1940, from aircraft of the United States Antarctic Service led by Admiral Richard Byrd, and was named by the Advisory Committee on Antarctic Names for sailmaker Linwood T. Miller, a member of the Byrd Antarctic Expedition, 1933–35, who produced windproof shirts, parkas, tents and other canvas materials for the expedition.

References

Ridges of Marie Byrd Land